Cotabato, formerly and colloquially known as North Cotabato, is a province in the Philippines.

Cotabato may also refer to:
 
 Cotabato (historical province), a historical former province of the Philippines (1914–1973)
 Cotabato City, an independent city geographically located in Maguindanao del Norte, Philippines
 Roman Catholic Archdiocese of Cotabato, an archdiocese on the island of Mindanao, the Philippines
 South Cotabato, a province in the Philippines

See also
 , a ship of the Philippine navy